Kotlina  is a village in the administrative district of Gmina Mirsk, within Lwówek Śląski County, Lower Silesian Voivodeship, in south-western Poland, close to the Czech border. Prior to 1945 it was in Germany.

References

Kotlina